The 1971 East Carolina Pirates football team was an American football team that represented East Carolina University as a member of the Southern Conference during the 1971 NCAA University Division football season. In their first season under head coach Sonny Randle, the team compiled a 4–6 record.

Schedule

References

East Carolina Pirates
East Carolina Pirates football seasons
East Carolina Pirates football